Klimovo may refer to:
Klimovo, Russia, several inhabited localities in Russia
Klimovo, alternative spelling of Klimove, name of several inhabited localities in Ukraine